The Black Beetle is a comic book series about a masked vigilante. It was created by Francesco Francavilla and published by Dark Horse Comics.

Publishing History

Pulp Sunday
The Black Beetle made its first appearance on the forum drawingboard.org on the twelfth of January, 2006, as ten-minute doodle. In 2009, Francesco Francavilla held a poll on his blog, Pulp Sunday. He had decided to do a webcomic and asked readers whether they would rather Max Malone or The Black Beetle, described as "in the vein of masked vigilante pulp in some sort of '40s/'50s settings, with some slight (40s/50s) sci-fi tone to it". More than two-thirds of the readers voted for The Black Beetle. Shortly after, he came up with the setting of Colt City, his own mix between New York City and Gotham City.

No Way Out
On Sunday, May 17, 2009, The Black Beetle made its debut as the opening page of No Way Out (although at the time this title had not yet been announced). This first appearance ran for a total of ten pages, appearing on most Sundays until August 2, when it ended with The Black Beetle falling from a rooftop. These ten pages were billed as the first part of six. The pages were printed in The Black Beetle ashcan, which was first sold at HeroesCon 2009.

Kara Böcek
In December 2009 Francesco Francavilla attempted to tell a shorter Black Beetle story, a one-shot, roughly 20 pages, between his paid publishing work. This story was released in a landscape format. The plan was to update as frequently as possible, sometimes twice a week on Sundays and Wednesdays. Upon reaching the tenth page, Francavilla stated the comic was one-third finished. Page 11, which was supposed to be the first page of the middle third of the story, was the last completed page.

The Kara Böcek was mentioned in the Dark Horse printing of The Black Beetle #1: No Way Out (Part 1), and Francavilla said he intends to return to the story some day in the letters column of The Black Beetle #0: Night Shift.

Dark Horse Comics

Night Shift
In December 2011 Dark Horse announced The Black Beetle'''s debut in the pages of Dark Horse Presents. The story, Night Shift, was told in three eight-page parts in issues #11–13 (April–June, 2012). The story was later republished as The Black Beetle #0 in December 2012.

No Way Out
At a Dark Horse convention panel in July 2012, Francavilla announced that The Black Beetle had been picked up for its first miniseries, No Way Out, the story originally started on his Pulp Sunday blog. The series began its run in January, 2013. The first ten pages were from the original version of the story on Pulp Sunday, but recolored and with altered text and art.

In 2013, at the Emerald City Comicon, it was announced that The Black Beetle would continue at Dark Horse as an ongoing monthly series. This was later corrected by editor Jim Gibbons, who said the series was going to be "semi-monthly". Francavilla has further clarified, it will be an ongoing series of miniseries.

Kara Böcek
In 2016, The Black Beetle returned to Dark Horse Presents. The new story, Kara Böcek, was adapted from the version originally published on the Pulp Sunday blog. The story commenced in Dark Horse Presents #28 in November 2016. The story ran in five issues, ending with Dark Horse Presents #32 in March 2016.

NecrologueNecrologue was initially announced as a five-issue miniseries to be released in 2013. However, no further issues were solicited after the fourth, and the title was removed from Dark Horse's publishing schedule.

Publications
Issues

CollectionsNight Shift and No Way Out are collected in the first Black Beetle'' hardcover volume, published October 2013.

References

External links
The Black Beetle blog
The Black Beetle - Twitter account
Dark Horse Comics

Dark Horse Comics characters